The Chui Mosque is a mosque in Chuí, Rio Grande do Sul, Brazil.

History
The construction of the mosque started in 2007. However, half way it was halted due to economical crisis.

Architecture
The mosque can accommodate up to 150 worshippers in its 520 m2 main prayer hall. It is divided into two floors where the ground floor is for male patrons and the upper floor is for female. It consists of a minaret and a dome with an outer height of 19 meters.

See also
 List of mosques in Brazil

References

Mosques in Brazil
Religious buildings and structures in Rio Grande do Sul